This Wade–Giles table is a complete listing of all Wade–Giles syllables used in Standard Chinese. Each syllable in a cell is composed of an initial (columns) and a final (rows). An empty cell indicates that the corresponding syllable does not exist in Standard Chinese.

The below table indicates possible combinations of initials and finals in Standard Chinese, but does not indicate tones, which are equally important to the proper pronunciation of Chinese. Although some initial-final combinations occur with each of the five different tones, most do not. Some only occur with one tone.

Finals are grouped into subsets a, i, u and ü. i, u and ü groupings indicate a combination of those finals with finals from Group a. The following exceptions exist:

Most syllables are a combination of an initial and a final. However, some syllables have no initials. These are written in Wade–Giles according to the following rules:
if the final begins with a u, replace the u with a w
if the final begins with an ü, add y in the beginning (no exceptions)
if the final begins with an i, replace the i with a y if there are other vowels; if there are no other vowels, add y in the beginning
if the final begins in any other way, keep the final as is
exceptions to the rules above are indicated by blue in the table's no initial column:

Colour Legend:
{|class=wikitable
|width=200 style="background:#EEEEEE;" | "regular" initial or final
Final is in Group a or is a direct combination of:
i+Group a final
u+Group a final
ü+Group a final
|width=200 style="background:#CCCCCC;" | Final of i, u, ü groups is a modified combination of:
i+Group a final
u+Group a final
ü+Group a final
|width=200| syllable is direct combination of initial and final (or follows rules for no-initial syllables outlined at the top of the page)
|width=200 style="background:#FFFFCC;" | syllable is written with the less common of the two spellings of the final;note the special spelling of the initials ts, ts, s in the syllables tzŭ, tzŭ, ssŭ
|}
Syllables that end with o have either the o/uo final or the ê/o final:
{|class=wikitable style="text-align:center;"
!IPA
|pu̯ɔ||pʰu̯ɔ||mu̯ɔ||fu̯ɔ||tu̯ɔ||tʰu̯ɔ||nu̯ɔ||lu̯ɔ||kɤ||kʰɤ||xɤ||ku̯ɔ||kʰu̯ɔ||xu̯ɔ||ʈʂu̯ɔ||ʈʂʰu̯ɔ||ʂu̯ɔ||ʐu̯ɔ||ʦu̯ɔ||ʦʰu̯ɔ||su̯ɔ||ɤ||u̯ɔ
|-
!Wade–Giles
|po||po||mo||fo||to||to||no||lo||ko||ko||ho||kuo||kuo||huo||cho||cho||shuo||jo||tso||tso||so||o/ê||wo
|-
!Bopomofo
|ㄅㄛ||ㄆㄛ||ㄇㄛ||ㄈㄛ||ㄉㄨㄛ||ㄊㄨㄛ||ㄋㄨㄛ||ㄌㄨㄛ||ㄍㄜ||ㄎㄜ||ㄏㄜ||ㄍㄨㄛ||ㄎㄨㄛ||ㄏㄨㄛ||ㄓㄨㄛ||ㄔㄨㄛ||ㄕㄨㄛ||ㄖㄨㄛ||ㄗㄨㄛ||ㄘㄨㄛ||ㄙㄨㄛ||ㄜ||ㄨㄛ
|-
!Pinyin
|bo||po||mo||fo||duo||tuo||nuo||luo||ge||ke||he||guo||kuo||huo||zhuo||chuo||shuo||ruo||zuo||cuo||suo||e||wo
|}

See also
Wade–Giles
Pinyin table
Palladius table
Zhuyin table

References

Romanization of Chinese
Mandarin words and phrases